The 2014 Gold Coast Titans season was the 8th in the club's history. Coached by John Cartwright and co-captained by Greg Bird and Nate Myles, they competed in the NRL's 2014 Telstra Premiership. During the second half of the season Cartwright resigned, and his position as head coach was taken by assistant coach Neil Henry for the remainder of the season. Gold Coast finished the regular season in 14th (out of 16) and failed to qualify the finals for the fourth consecutive year.

Season summary
On 7 January, the Titans released Jamal Idris from the remaining 3 years of his contract so he could return to Sydney to be closer to his family. In a deal between the Titans and the Penrith Panthers, Idris joined the Panthers on a three-year deal and Brad Tighe moved from the Panthers to the Titans.

Milestones
Round 1: Luke Douglas plays his 195th consecutive NRL game, surpassing Jason Taylor's record of 194
Round 1: Maurice Blair and Brad Tighe made their debuts for the club
Round 1: Paul Carter made his first grade debut
Round 2: Luke Douglas and Ben Ridge played their 50th game for the club
Round 2: Aidan Sezer scored his 200th career point
Round 3: Paul Carter scored his 1st career try
Round 5: Brad Takairangi played his 50th career game
Round 6: Luke Douglas played his 200th career game
Round 6: Kevin Gordon played his 100th game for the club 
Round 8: Cody Nelson made his first grade debut
Round 9: Nate Myles played his 50th game for the club
Round 10: Kalifa Faifai Loa made his debut for the club
Round 11: David Mead played his 100th game for the club
Round 14: Caleb Binge made his first grade debut
Round 14: James Roberts made his debut for the club
Round 15: Daniel Mortimer made his debut for the club
Round 15: Matt White play his 100th game for the club
Round 17: Tom Kingston made his first grade debut
Round 17: Mark Minichiello played his 250th career game
Round 22: Dave Taylor played his 150th career game
Round 23: Aidan Sezer played his 5oth career game
Round 24: Luke Bailey played his 150th game for the club
Round 24: Daniel Mortimer played his 100th career game

Squad List

Squad Movement

Gains

Losses

Re-Signings

Contract Lengths

Ladder

Fixtures

Pre-season

NRL Auckland Nines

The NRL Auckland Nines is a pre-season rugby league nines competition featuring all 16 NRL clubs. The 2014 competition was played over two days on 15 and 16 February at Eden Park in Auckland, New Zealand. The Titans featured in Pool Blue and played the Sharks, Knights and Tigers. The Titans failed to qualify for the quarter finals.

Regular season

Statistics

Source:

Representatives
The following players have played a representative match in 2014

Honours

League
Nil

Club
Paul Broughton Medal: Beau Falloon
Community Award: Ryan James
'The Preston': Luke Bailey
Rookie of the year: Paul Carter
Members Choice: Luke Bailey
U/20s Player of the year: Anthony Colman

References

Gold Coast Titans seasons
Gold Coast Titans season